School District of River Falls is a school district headquartered in River Falls, Wisconsin.

Schools
 River Falls High School
 Meyer Middle School
 Elementary schools:
 Greenwood
 Montessori
 Rocky Branch
 Westside
 Renaissance Charter Academy

References

External links
 School District of River Falls

School districts in Wisconsin
School District